Baho Majra is a village located in Khanna tehsil, in the Ludhiana district of Punjab, India. The total population of the village is about 1,268.

References

Villages in Ludhiana district